

Narva-Jõesuu Lighthouse is a lighthouse located in Narva-Jõesuu, Estonia, on the Gulf of Finland (Baltic Sea).

History 
A lighthouse operated here already during the time of Swedish rule of Estonia, in the 17th century. A stone lighthouse was built in 1808 at the initiative of Leontiy Spafaryev of the Russian Admiralty. It suffered damage during the Crimean War but was repaired in 1870 because of its unstable foundations. In 1941 it was completely destroyed. A new lighthouse (the presently visible) was built in 1957.

See also 

 List of lighthouses in Estonia

References

External links 

 

Lighthouses completed in 1957
Lighthouses in Estonia
Buildings and structures in Ida-Viru County